Gdańsk (also  ; ; ;  ;) is a city on the Baltic coast of northern Poland. With a population of 470,621, Gdańsk is the capital and largest city of the Pomeranian Voivodeship. It is Poland's principal seaport and the country's fourth-largest metropolitan area.

The city lies at the southern edge of Gdańsk Bay, close to the city of Gdynia and resort town of Sopot; these form a metropolitan area called the Tricity (Trójmiasto), with a population of approximately 1.5 million. Gdańsk lies at the mouth of the Motława River, connected to the Leniwka, a branch in the delta of the Vistula River, which connects Gdańsk with the Polish capital Warsaw.

The history of the city has a complex history, having had periods of Polish and German rule, and autonomy as a free city. An important shipbuilding and trade port since the Middle Ages, in 1361 it became a member of the Hanseatic League which defined its economic, demographic and urban landscape. From 1918 to 1939, Gdańsk lay in the disputed Polish Corridor; its ambiguous political status created tensions that culminated in the Invasion of Poland and the first clash of the Second World War at nearby Westerplatte. The contemporary city was shaped by extensive border changes, expulsions and new settlement after 1945. In the 1980s, Gdańsk was the birthplace of the Solidarity movement, which helped precipitate the collapse of the Eastern Bloc, the fall of the Berlin Wall and the dissolution of the Warsaw Pact.

Gdańsk is home to the University of Gdańsk, Gdańsk University of Technology, the National Museum, the Gdańsk Shakespeare Theatre, the Museum of the Second World War, the Polish Baltic Philharmonic and the European Solidarity Centre. Among Gdańsk's most notable historical landmarks are the Town Hall, the Green Gate, Artus Court, Neptune's Fountain, and St. Mary's Church, one of the largest brick churches in the world. The city is served by Gdańsk Lech Wałęsa Airport, the country's third busiest airport and the most important international airport in northern Poland. Companies headquartered in Gdańsk include energy provider Energa SA and clothing retailer LPP.

Gdańsk is among the most visited cities in Poland, received 3.4 million tourists per year according to data collected in 2019. The city also hosts St. Dominic's Fair, which dates back to 1260, and is regarded as one of the biggest trade and cultural events in Europe. Gdańsk has also topped rankings for the quality of life, safety and living standards worldwide, and its historic city center has been listed as one of Poland's national monuments. Nearby sights include Malbork Castle, the Kashubian Lake District, Hel Peninsula and the resort town of Sopot.

Names

Origin

The name of the city was most likely derived from Gdania, a river presently known as Motława on which the city is situated. Linguists argue that the name stems from the Proto-Slavic adjective/prefix gъd-, which meant wet or moist with the addition of the morpheme ń/ni and the suffix -sk.

History
The name of the settlement was recorded after St. Adalbert's death in 997 CE as urbs Gyddanyzc and it was later written as Kdanzk in 1148, Gdanzc in 1188, Danceke in 1228, Gdańsk in 1236, Danzc in 1263, Danczk in 1311, Danczik in 1399, Danczig in 1414 and Gdąnsk in 1656.

In Polish documents the form Gdańsk was always used. While in the Teutonic and then German, the form Danzig began to emerge. The name Danzig was created by distorting the original Polish name of the city. The consonant group "gd", which was difficult for Germans to pronounce, was simplified to "d" (Danzc from 1263). Subsequently, the consonant "s" was changed to the German phoneme "ts," rendered graphically as "cz" (Danczk from 1311). Then, for easier pronunciation, the vowel "i" appeared (Danczik from 1399, then Danzig).

In Polish the modern name of the city is pronounced . The German name, Danzig, is pronounced . The city's Latin name may be given as either Gedania, Gedanum, or Dantiscum; the variety of Latin names reflects the mixed influence of the city's Polish, German and Kashubian heritage. Other former spellings of the name include Dantzig, Dantsic, and Dantzic.

Ceremonial names
On special occasions the city is also referred to as "The Royal Polish City of Gdańsk" (Polish: Królewskie Polskie Miasto Gdańsk, Latin: Regia Civitas Polonica Gedanensis, Kashubian: Królewsczi Pòlsczi Gard Gduńsk). In the Kashubian language the city is called . Although some Kashubians may also use the name "Our Capital City Gduńsk" (Nasz Stoleczny Gard Gduńsk) or "The Kashubian Capital City Gduńsk" (Stoleczny Kaszëbsczi Gard Gduńsk), the cultural and historical connections between the city and the region of Kashubia are debatable and use of such names rises controversy among Kashubians.

History

Ancient history
The oldest evidence found for the existence of a settlement on the lands of what is now Gdańsk comes from the Bronze Age (which is estimated to be from 2500–1700 BC). The settlement that is now known as Gdańsk began in the 9th century, being mostly an agriculture and fishing-dependent village. In the beginning of the 10th century, it began becoming an important centre for trade (especially between the Pomeranians) until its annexation in  975 by Mieszko I.

Early Poland

The first written record thought to refer to Gdańsk is the vita of Saint Adalbert. Written in 999, it describes how in 997 Saint Adalbert of Prague baptised the inhabitants of urbs Gyddannyzc, "which separated the great realm of the duke [i.e., Bolesław the Brave of Poland] from the sea." No further written sources exist for the 10th and 11th centuries. Based on the date in Adalbert's vita, the city celebrated its millennial anniversary in 1997.

Archaeological evidence for the origins of the town was retrieved mostly after World War II had laid 90percent of the city centre in ruins, enabling excavations. The oldest seventeen settlement levels were dated to between 980 and 1308. Mieszko I of Poland erected a stronghold on the site in the 980s, thereby connecting the Polish state ruled by the Piast dynasty with the trade routes of the Baltic Sea. Traces of buildings and housing from the 10th century have been found in archaeological excavations of the city.

Pomeranian Poland

The site was ruled as a duchy of Poland by the Samborides. It consisted of a settlement at the modern Long Market, settlements of craftsmen along the Old Ditch, German merchant settlements around St Nicholas's church and the old Piast stronghold. In 1186, a Cistercian monastery was set up in nearby Oliwa, which is now within the city limits. In 1215, the ducal stronghold became the centre of a Pomerelian splinter duchy. At that time the area of the later city included various villages. From at least 1224/25 a German market settlement with merchants from Lübeck existed in the area of today's Long Market.

In 1224/25, merchants from Lübeck were invited as hospites (immigrants with specific privileges) but were soon (in 1238) forced to leave by Swantopolk II of the Samborides during a war between Swantopolk and the Teutonic Knights, during which Lübeck supported the latter. Migration of merchants to the town resumed in 1257. Significant German influence did not reappear until the 14th century, after the takeover of the city by the Teutonic Knights.

At latest in 1263 Pomerelian duke, Swantopolk II. granted city rights under Lübeck law to the emerging market settlement. It was an autonomy charter similar to that of Lübeck, which was also the primary origin of many settlers. In a document of 1271 the Pomerelian duke Mestwin II addressed the Lübeck merchants settled in the city as his loyal citizens from Germany.

In 1300, the town had an estimated population of 2,000. While overall the town was far from an important trade centre at that time, it had some relevance in the trade with Eastern Europe. Low on funds, the Samborides lent the settlement to Brandenburg, although they planned to take the city back and give it to Poland. Poland threatened to intervene, and the Brandenburgians left the town. Subsequently, the city was taken by Danish princes in 1301.

Teutonic Knights

In 1308, the town was taken by Brandenburg and the Teutonic Knights restored order. Subsequently, the Knights took over control of the town. Primary sources record a massacre carried out by the Teutonic Knights against the local population, of 10,000 people, but the exact number killed is subject of dispute in modern scholarship. Multiple authors accept the number given in the original sources, while others consider 10,000 to have been a medieval exaggeration, although scholarly consensus is that a massacre of some magnitude did take place. The events were used by the Polish crown to condemn the Teutonic Knights in a subsequent papal lawsuit.

The knights colonized the area, replacing local Kashubians and Poles with German settlers. In 1308, they founded Osiek Hakelwerk near the town, initially as a Slavic fishing settlement. In 1340, the Teutonic Knights constructed a large fortress, which became the seat of the knights' Komtur. In 1346 they changed the Town Law of the city, which then consisted only of the Rechtstadt, to Kulm law. In 1358, Danzig joined the Hanseatic League, and became an active member in 1361. It maintained relations with the trade centres Bruges, Novgorod, Lisboa, and Sevilla. Around 1377, the Old Town was equipped with city rights as well. In 1380, the New Town was founded as the third, independent settlement.

After a series of Polish-Teutonic Wars, in the Treaty of Kalisz (1343) the Order had to acknowledge that it would hold Pomerelia as a fief from the Polish Crown. Although it left the legal basis of the Order's possession of the province in some doubt, the city thrived as a result of increased exports of grain (especially wheat), timber, potash, tar, and other goods of forestry from Prussia and Poland via the Vistula River trading routes, although after its capture, the Teutonic Knights tried to actively reduce the economic significance of the town. While under the control of the Teutonic Order German migration increased. The Order's religious networks helped to develop Danzig's literary culture. A new war broke out in 1409, culminating in the Battle of Grunwald (1410), and the city came under the control of the Kingdom of Poland. A year later, with the First Peace of Thorn, it returned to the Teutonic Order.

Kingdom of Poland

In 1440, the city participated in the foundation of the Prussian Confederation which was an organisation opposed to the rule of the Teutonic Knights. The organisation in its complaint of 1453 mentioned repeated cases in which the Teutonic Knights imprisoned or murdered local patricians and mayors without a court verdict. On the request of the organisation King Casimir IV of Poland reincorporated the territory to the Kingdom of Poland in 1454. This led to the Thirteen Years' War between Poland and the State of the Teutonic Order (1454–1466). Since 1454, the city was authorized by the King to mint Polish coins. The local mayor pledged allegiance to the King during the incorporation in March 1454 in Kraków, and the city again solemnly pledged allegiance to the King in June 1454 in Elbląg, recognizing the prior Teutonic annexation and rule as unlawful. On 25 May 1457 the city gained its rights as an autonomous city.

On 15 May 1457, Casimir IV of Poland granted the town the Great Privilege, after he had been invited by the town's council and had already stayed in town for five weeks. With the Great Privilege, the town was granted full autonomy and protection by the King of Poland. The privilege removed tariffs and taxes on trade within Poland, Lithuania, and Ruthenia (present day Belarus and Ukraine), and conferred on the town independent jurisdiction, legislation and administration of her territory, as well as the right to mint its own coin. Furthermore, the privilege united Old Town, Osiek, and Main Town, and legalised the demolition of New Town, which had sided with the Teutonic Knights. By 1457, New Town was demolished completely, no buildings remained.

Gaining free and privileged access to Polish markets, the seaport prospered while simultaneously trading with the other Hanseatic cities. After the Second Peace of Thorn (1466) between Poland and the Teutonic Order the warfare ended permanently. After the Union of Lublin between Poland and Lithuania in 1569 the city continued to enjoy a large degree of internal autonomy (cf. Danzig law). Being the largest and one of the most influential cities of Poland, it enjoyed voting rights during the royal election period in Poland.

In the 1560s and 1570s, a large Mennonite community started growing in the city, gaining significant popularity. In the 1575 election to the Polish throne, Danzig supported Maximilian II in his struggle against Stephen Báthory. It was the latter who eventually became monarch but the city, encouraged by the secret support of Denmark and Emperor Maximilian, shut its gates against Stephen. After the Siege of Danzig, lasting six months, the city's army of 5,000 mercenaries was utterly defeated in a field battle on 16 December 1577. However, since Stephen's armies were unable to take the city by force, a compromise was reached: Stephen Báthory confirmed the city's special status and her Danzig law privileges granted by earlier Polish kings. The city recognised him as ruler of Poland and paid the enormous sum of 200,000 guldens in gold as payoff ("apology").

During the Polish–Swedish War of 1626–1629, in 1627, the naval Battle of Oliwa was fought near the city, and it is one of the greatest victories in the history of the Polish Navy. During the Swedish invasion of Poland of 1655–1660, commonly known as the Deluge, the city was unsuccessfully besieged by Sweden. In 1660, the war was ended with the Treaty of Oliwa, signed in the present-day district of Oliwa.

Around 1640, Johannes Hevelius established his astronomical observatory in the Old Town. Polish King John III Sobieski regularly visited Hevelius numerous times.

Beside a majority of German-speakers, whose elites sometimes distinguished their German dialect as Pomerelian, the city was home to a large number of Polish-speaking Poles, Jewish Poles, Latvian-speaking Kursenieki, Flemings, and Dutch. In addition, a number of Scots took refuge or migrated to and received citizenship in the city. During the Protestant Reformation, most German-speaking inhabitants adopted Lutheranism. Due to the special status of the city and significance within the Polish–Lithuanian Commonwealth, the city inhabitants largely became bi-cultural sharing both Polish and German culture and were strongly attached to the traditions of the Polish–Lithuanian Commonwealth.

The city suffered a last great plague and a slow economic decline due to the wars of the 18th century. As a stronghold of Stanisław Leszczyński's supporters during the War of the Polish Succession, it was taken by the Russians after the Siege of Danzig in 1734. However, by the end of the 18th century, Gdańsk was still one of the most economically integrated cities in Poland. It was well-connected and traded actively with German cities, while other Polish cities became less well-integrated towards the end of the century, mostly due to greater risks for long-distance trade, given the number of violent conflicts along the trade routes. The Danzig Research Society, which became defunct in 1936, was founded in 1743.

Prussia and Germany
Danzig was annexed by the Kingdom of Prussia in 1793, in the Second Partition of Poland. Both the Polish and the German-speaking population largely opposed the Prussian annexation and wished the city to remain part of Poland. The mayor of the city stepped down from his office due to the annexation, and also notable city councilor Jan (Johann) Uphagen, historian and art collector, whose Baroque house is now a museum, resigned as a sign of protest against the annexation. An attempted student uprising against Prussia led by Gottfried Benjamin Bartholdi was crushed quickly by the authorities in 1797.

During the Napoleonic Wars, in 1807, the city was besieged and captured by a coalition of French, Polish, Italian, Saxon, and Baden forces. Afterwards, it was a free city from 1807 to 1814, when it was captured by combined Prussian-Russian forces.

In 1815, after France's defeat in the Napoleonic Wars, it again became part of Prussia and became the capital of  within the province of West Prussia. The city's longest serving president was Robert von Blumenthal, who held office from 1841, through the revolutions of 1848, until 1863. With the unification of Germany in 1871 under Prussian hegemony, the city became part of the German Empire and remained so until 1919, after Germany's defeat in World War I.

Inter-war years and World War II

When Poland regained its independence after World War I with access to the sea as promised by the Allies on the basis of Woodrow Wilson's "Fourteen Points" (point 13 called for "an independent Polish state", "which should be assured a free and secure access to the sea"), the Poles hoped the city's harbour would also become part of Poland.

However, in the end – since Germans formed a majority in the city, with Poles being a minority (in the 1923 census 7,896 people out of 335,921 gave Polish, Kashubian, or Masurian as their native language) – the city was not placed under Polish sovereignty. Instead, in accordance with the terms of the Versailles Treaty, it became the Free City of Danzig, an independent quasi-state under the auspices of the League of Nations with its external affairs largely under Polish control – without, however, any public vote to legitimize Germany's loss of the city.

Poland's rights also included free use of the harbour, a Polish post office, a Polish garrison in Westerplatte district, and customs union with Poland. The Free City had its own constitution, national anthem, parliament, and government. It issued its own stamps as well as its currency, the Danzig gulden.

With the growth of Nazism among Germans, anti-Polish sentiment increased and both Germanisation and segregation policies intensified, in the 1930s the rights of local Poles were commonly violated and limited by the local administration. Polish children were refused admission to public Polish-language schools, premises were not allowed to be rented to Polish schools and preschools. Due to such policies, only 8 Polish-language public schools existed in the city, and Poles managed to organize 7 more private Polish schools.

In 1937, Poles who sent their children to private Polish schools were demanded to transfer children to German schools, under threat of police intervention, and attacks were carried out on Polish schools and Polish youth. German militias carried out numerous beatings of Polish activists, scouts, and even mailmen, as "punishment" for distributing the Polish press. German students attacked and expelled Polish students from the technical university. Dozens of Polish surnames were forcibly Germanized, while Polish symbols that reminded that for centuries Gdańsk was part of Poland were removed from the city's landmarks, such as the Artus Court and the Neptune's Fountain.

From 1937, the employment of Poles by German companies was prohibited, and already employed Poles were fired, the use of Polish in public places was banned and Poles were not allowed to enter several restaurants, in particular those owned by Germans. In 1939, before the German invasion of Poland and outbreak of World War II, local Polish railwaymen were victims of beatings, and after the invasion, they were also imprisoned and murdered in concentration camps.

In the early 1930s, the local Nazi Party capitalised on pro-German sentiments and in 1933 garnered 50% of vote in the parliament. Thereafter, the Nazis under Gauleiter Albert Forster achieved dominance in the city government, which was still nominally overseen by the League of Nations' High Commissioner. The German government officially demanded the return of Danzig to Germany along with an extraterritorial (meaning under German jurisdiction) highway through the area of the Polish Corridor for land-based access from the rest of Germany. Hitler used the issue of the status of the city as a pretext for attacking Poland and in May 1939, during a high-level meeting of German military officials explained to them: "It is not Danzig that is at stake. For us it is a matter of expanding our Lebensraum in the east", adding that there will be no repeat of the Czech situation, and Germany will attack Poland at first opportunity, after isolating the country from its Western Allies.

After the German proposals to solve the three main issues peacefully were refused, German-Polish relations rapidly deteriorated. Germany attacked Poland on 1 September after having signed a non-aggression pact with the Soviet Union.

The German attack began in Danzig, with a bombardment of Polish positions at Westerplatte by the German battleship , and the landing of German infantry on the peninsula. Outnumbered Polish defenders at Westerplatte resisted for seven days before running out of ammunition. Meanwhile, after a fierce day-long fight (1 September 1939), defenders of the Polish Post office were tried and executed then buried on the spot in the Danzig quarter of Zaspa in October 1939. In 1998 a German court overturned their conviction and sentence.

The city was officially annexed by Nazi Germany and incorporated into the Reichsgau Danzig-West Prussia. About 50 percent of members of the Jewish community had left the city within a year after a pogrom in October 1937, after the Kristallnacht riots in November 1938, the community decided to organize its emigration and in March 1939 a first transport to Palestine started. By September 1939 barely 1,700 mostly elderly Jews remained. In early 1941, just 600 Jews were still living in Danzig, most of whom were later murdered in the Holocaust.

Out of the 2,938 Jewish community in the city 1,227 were able to escape from the Nazis before the outbreak of war. Nazi secret police had been observing Polish minority communities in the city since 1936, compiling information, which in 1939 served to prepare lists of Poles to be captured in Operation Tannenberg. On the first day of the war, approximately 1,500 ethnic Poles were arrested, some because of their participation in social and economic life, others because they were activists and members of various Polish organisations. Many Poles living in Danzig were deported to Stutthof or executed in the Piaśnica forest.

During the war, the Germans operated a Nazi prison in the city, an Einsatzgruppen-operated penal camp, a camp for Romani people, and several subcamps of the Stutthof concentration camp within the present-day city limits.

In 1941, Hitler ordered the invasion of the Soviet Union, eventually causing the fortunes of war to turn against Germany. As the Soviet Army advanced in 1944, German populations in Central and Eastern Europe took flight, resulting in the beginning of a great population shift. After the final Soviet offensives began in January 1945, hundreds of thousands of German refugees converged on Danzig, many of whom had fled on foot from East Prussia, some tried to escape through the city's port in a large-scale evacuation involving hundreds of German cargo and passenger ships. Some of the ships were sunk by the Soviets, including the  after an evacuation was attempted at neighbouring Gdynia. In the process, tens of thousands of refugees were killed.

The city also endured heavy Allied and Soviet air raids. Those who survived and could not escape had to face the Soviet Army, which captured the heavily damaged city on 30 March 1945, followed by large-scale rape and looting. In line with the decisions made by the Allies at the Yalta and Potsdam conferences, the city was annexed by Poland, although with a Soviet-installed communist regime, which stayed in power until the Fall of Communism in the 1980s. The remaining German residents of the city who had survived the war fled or were expelled to postwar Germany. The city was repopulated by ethnic Poles; up to 18 percent (1948) of them had been deported by the Soviets in two major waves from pre-war eastern Polish areas annexed by the Soviet Union.

Contemporary times

In 1946, the communists executed 17-year-old Danuta Siedzikówna and 42-year-old Feliks Selmanowicz, Polish resistance members, in the local prison.

The port of Gdańsk was one of the three Polish ports through which Greeks and Macedonians, refugees of the Greek Civil War, reached Poland. In 1949, four transports of Greek and Macedonian refugees arrived at the port of Gdańsk, from where they were transported to new homes in Poland.

Parts of the historic old city of Gdańsk, which had suffered large-scale destruction during the war, were rebuilt during the 1950s and 1960s. The reconstruction sought to dilute the German character of the city, and set it back to how it supposedly looked like before the annexation to Prussia in 1793. Nineteenth-century transformations were ignored as "ideologically malignant" by post-war administrations, or regarded as "Prussian barbarism" worth of demolition, while Flemish/Dutch, Italian and French influences were emphasized in order to "neutralize" the German influx on the general outlook of the city.

Boosted by heavy investment in the development of its port and three major shipyards for Soviet ambitions in the Baltic region, Gdańsk became the major shipping and industrial centre of the People's Republic of Poland. In December 1970, Gdańsk was the scene of anti-regime demonstrations, which led to the downfall of Poland's communist leader Władysław Gomułka. During the demonstrations in Gdańsk and Gdynia, military as well as the police opened fire on the demonstrators causing several dozen deaths. Ten years later, in August 1980, Gdańsk Shipyard was the birthplace of the Solidarity trade union movement.

In September 1981, to deter Solidarity, Soviet Union launched Exercise Zapad-81, the largest military exercise in history, during which amphibious landings were conducted near Gdańsk. Meanwhile, the Solidarity held its first national congress in Hala Olivia, Gdańsk when more than 800 deputies participated. Its opposition to the Communist regime led to the end of Communist Party rule in 1989, and sparked a series of protests that overthrew the Communist regimes of the former Soviet bloc. Solidarity's leader, Lech Wałęsa, became President of Poland in 1990. In 2014 the European Solidarity Centre, a museum and library devoted to the history of the movement, opened in Gdańsk.

On 9 July 2001, the city was flooded, with 200 million zł being estimated in damage, 4 people killed, and 304 evacuated. As a result, the city has built 50 reservoirs, the number of which is rising.

Gdańsk native Donald Tusk became Prime Minister of Poland in 2007, and President of the European Council in 2014. In 2014, the remains of Danuta Siedzikówna and Feliks Selmanowicz were found at the local Garrison Cemetery, and then their state burial was held in Gdańsk in 2016, with the participation of thousands of people from all over Poland and the highest Polish authorities.

In January 2019, the Mayor of Gdańsk, Paweł Adamowicz, was assassinated by a man who had just been released from prison for violent crimes. After stabbing the mayor in the abdomen near the heart, the man claimed that the mayor's political party had been responsible for imprisoning him. Though Adamowicz underwent a multi-hour surgery, he died the next day.

In October 2019, the City of Gdańsk was awarded the Princess of Asturias Award in the Concord category as a recognition of the fact that "the past and present in Gdańsk are sensitive to solidarity, the defense of freedom and human rights, as well as to the preservation of peace".

Geography

Climate

Gdańsk has a climate with both oceanic and continental influences. According to some categorizations, it has an oceanic climate (Cfb), while others classify it as belonging to the continental climate zone (Dfb). Gdańsk's dry winters and the precipitation maximum in summer are indicators of continentality. However seasonal extremes are less pronounced than those in inland Poland.

The city has moderately cold and cloudy winters with mean temperature in January and February near or below  and mild summers with frequent showers and thunderstorms. In general, the weather is damp, variable, and mild.

The seasons are clearly differentiated. Spring starts in March and is initially cold and windy, later becoming pleasantly warm and often increasingly sunny. Gdańsk averages 1,700 hours of sunshine per year. July and August are the warmest months. Autumn comes in September and is at first warm and usually sunny, turning cold, damp, and foggy in November. Winter lasts from December to March and includes periods of snow.

Economy
The industrial sections of the city are dominated by shipbuilding, petrochemical, and chemical industries, as well as food processing. The share of high-tech sectors such as electronics, telecommunications, IT engineering, cosmetics, and pharmaceuticals is on the rise. Amber processing is also an important part of the local economy, as the majority of the world's amber deposits lie along the Baltic coast. The Pomeranian Voivodeship, including Gdańsk, is also a major tourist destination in the summer, as millions of Poles and other European tourists flock to the beaches of the Baltic coastline.

Major companies in Gdańsk:

Acxiom – IT
Arla Foods – food processing
Bayer Shared Service Centre – finance & accounting
Cognor – steel, engineering, capital goods
Coleman Research – knowledge broker
Crist – shipbuilding
Delphi – automotive parts
Dr. Oetker – food processing
Grupa Lotos – energy, petrol refinery
Energa Trading – electrical and heat energy
Bank BPH – finance
Gdańska Stocznia Remontowa – shipbuilding
Elektrociepłownie Wybrzeże – energy
LPP – retail
Polnord Energobudowa – construction company
Petrobaltic – energy, oil drilling
Intel – IT
IBM – IT
IVONA – IT
FINEOS – IT
Wirtualna Polska – internet service
Kainos – IT
Lufthansa Systems – IT
Jeppesen – IT
Compuware – IT
Thomson Reuters – media
ThyssenKrupp – steel, engineering, capital goods
Maersk Line – services & pick-up
Transcom WorldWide – business processing outsourcing
Jysk – retail
Meritum Bank – finance
Glencore – raw materials
Orlen Morena – energy
Fosfory Ciech – chemical company
Hydrobudowa – construction company
Llentabhallen – steel constructions
Ziaja – cosmetics and beauty company
Stabilator – construction company
Skanska – construction company
Flügger – paints manufacturing
HD heavy duty – retail
Dresser Wayne – retail fueling systems
First Data – finance
Masterlease – finance
Transcom WorldWide – business processing outsourcing
Weyerhaeuser Cellulose Fibres – cellulose fibre manufacturing
Gdańsk Shipyard – shipbuilding
OIE Support – education services (part of Laureate International Universities)
PricewaterhouseCoopers – professional services
Kemira – chemical industry group
BreakThru Films – animated film studio
Schibsted – IT
IWG – business support services
Mango Media – home shopping channel
MOL Europe – shipping
VB Leasing – finance
Metsä Group – forest industry
Competence Call Centre – call centre
EPAM Systems – IT
Esotiq&Henderson – retail
Bayer – chemical and pharmaceutical company
Playsoft – IT
Staples Advantage – office products
Deloitte – professional services
KPMG – professional services
Comarch – IT
ESO Audit – professional services
TF Bank – finance
Ensono – IT

Main sights

Architecture

The city has some buildings surviving from the time of the Hanseatic League. Most tourist attractions are located along or near Ulica Długa (Long Street) and Długi Targ (Long Market), a pedestrian thoroughfare surrounded by buildings reconstructed in historical (primarily during the 17th century) style and flanked at both ends by elaborate city gates. This part of the city is sometimes referred to as the Royal Route, since it was once the former path of processions for visiting Kings of Poland.

Walking from end to end, sites encountered on or near the Royal Route include:
Highland Gate (Brama Wyżynna), which marks the beginning of the Royal Route
Torture House (Katownia) and Prison Tower (Wieża więzienna), now housing the Amber Museum (Muzeum Bursztynu)
Mansion of the Society of Saint George (Dwór Bractwa św. Jerzego)
Golden Gate (Złota Brama)
Ulica Długa ("Long Lane"), filled with picturesque tenements
Uphagen's House (Dom Uphagena), branch of the Museum of Gdańsk
Lion's Castle (Lwi Zamek)
Main Town Hall (Ratusz Głównego Miasta, built 1378–1492)
Długi Targ ("Long Market")
Artus' Court (Dwór Artusa)
Neptune's Fountain (Fontanna Neptuna), a masterpiece by architect Abraham van den Blocke, 1617.
New Jury House (Nowy Dom Ławy), in which the seemingly 17th-century Maiden in the Window appears every day during the tourist season, referring to a popular novel Panienka z okienka ("Maiden in the Window") by Jadwiga Łuszczewska, set in 17th-century Gdańsk
Golden House (Złota Kamienica), a distinctive Renaissance townhouse from the early 17th century, decorated with numerous reliefs and sculptures
Green Gate (Zielona Brama), a Mannerist gate, built as a formal residence of Polish kings, now housing a branch of the National Museum in Gdańsk

Gdańsk has a number of historical churches, including St. Catherine's Church and St. Mary's Church (Bazylika Mariacka). This latter is a municipal church built during the 15th century, and is the largest brick church in the world.

The city's 17th-century fortifications represent one of Poland's official national Historic Monuments (Pomnik historii), as designated on 16 September 1994 and tracked by the National Heritage Board of Poland.

Other main sights in the historical city centre includde:
Royal Chapel of the Polish King John III Sobieski
Żuraw – medieval port crane
Gradowa Hill
Granaries on the Ołowianka and Granary Islands
Great Armoury
John III Sobieski Monument
Old Town Hall
Jan Heweliusz Monument
Great Mill (1350)
Small Mill 
Mariacka Street
House of Research Society
Polish Post Office, site of the 1939 battle
brick gothic town gates, i.e., Mariacka Gate, Straganiarska Gate, Cow Gate

Main sights outside the historical city centre include:
Abbot's Palace in the Oliwa Park
Lighthouse in Nowy Port
Oliwa Cathedral
Pachołek Hill – an observation point in Oliwa
Pier in Brzeźno
Medieval city walls
Westerplatte
Wisłoujście Fortress
Gdańsk Zoo

Museums

National Museum (Muzeum Narodowe)
Department of Ancient Art – contains a number of important artworks, including Hans Memling's Last Judgement
Green Gate
Department of Modern Art – in the Abbot's Palace in Oliwa
Ethnography Department – in the Abbot's Granary in Oliwa
Gdańsk Photography Gallery
Historical Museum (Muzeum Historyczne Miasta Gdańska):
Main Town Hall
Artus' Court
Uphagen's House
Amber Museum (Muzeum Bursztynu)
Museum of the Polish Post (Muzeum Poczty Polskiej)
Wartownia nr 1 na Westerplatte
Museum of Tower Clocks (Muzeum Zegarów Wieżowych)
Wisłoujście Fortress
National Maritime Museum, Gdańsk (Narodowe Muzeum Morskie):
Żuraw Crane
Granaries in Ołowianka
museum ship SS Sołdek is anchored on the Motława River and was the first ship built in post-war Poland.
European Solidarity Centre. Museum and library dedicated to the history of the Solidarity movement.
Archeological Museum (Muzeum Archeologiczne)
Gdańsk Nowy Port Lighthouse (Latarnia Morska Gdańsk Nowy Port)
Izba Pamięci Wincentego Pola w Gdańsku-Sobieszewie
Archdiocese Museum (Muzeum Archidiecezjalne)
Museum of the Second World War

Entertainment
Polish Baltic Philharmonic
Baltic Opera
Teatr Wybrzeże
Gdańsk Shakespeare Theatre is a Shakespearean theatre built on the historical site of a 17th-century playhouse where English travelling players came to perform. The new theatre, completed in 2014, hosts the annual Gdańsk Shakespeare Festival.

Transport

Gdańsk Lech Wałęsa Airport – an international airport located in Gdańsk;
The Szybka Kolej Miejska, (SKM) the Fast Urban Railway, functions as a Metro system for the Tricity area including Gdańsk, Sopot and Gdynia, operating frequent trains to 27 stations covering the Tricity. The service is operated by electric multiple unit trains at a frequency of 6 minutes to 30 minutes between trains (depending on the time of day) on the central section between Gdańsk and Gdynia, and less frequently on outlying sections.
Railways: The principal station in Gdańsk is Gdańsk Główny railway station, served by both SKM local trains and PKP long-distance trains. In addition, long-distance trains also stop at Gdańsk Oliwa railway station, Gdańsk Wrzeszcz railway station, Sopot, and Gdynia. Gdańsk also has nine other railway stations, served by local SKM trains;
Long-distance trains are operated by PKP Intercity which provides connections with all major Polish cities, including Warsaw, Kraków, Łódź, Poznań, Katowice, and Szczecin, and with the neighbouring Kashubian Lakes region.

In December 2014 new Alstom Pendolino high-speed trains were put into service between Gdańsk, Warsaw and Kraków reducing the rail travel time from Gdańsk to Warsaw to 2 hours 58 minutes, further reduced in December 2015 to 2 hours 39 minutes.

A new railway, Pomorska Kolej Metropolitalna (PKM, the 'Pomeranian Metropolitan Railway'), commenced service on 1 September 2015, connecting Gdańsk Lech Wałęsa Airport with Wrzeszcz and downtown Gdańsk. It connects to the Szybka Kolej Miejska (Tricity) (SKM) which provides further connections to the entire area served by SKM.
City buses and trams are operated by ZTM Gdańsk (Zarząd Transportu Miejskiego w Gdańsku).
From 1 October 2018 selected circuits of line 31 from PKT Gdynia go to bus stop Sopot Ergo Arena without trolley pole. Small part of this rote passes through Gdańsk.
Port of Gdańsk – a seaport located on the southern coast of Gdańsk Bay within the city;
Obwodnica Trojmiejska – part of expressway S6 that bypasses the cities of Gdańsk, Sopot and Gdynia.
The A1 motorway connects the port and city of Gdańsk with the southern border of the country. , some fragments of the A1 motorway are still incomplete.

Gdańsk is the starting point of the EuroVelo 9 cycling route which continues southward through Poland, then into the Czech Republic, Austria and Slovenia before ending at the Adriatic Sea in Pula, Croatia.

Additionally, Gdańsk is part of the Rail-2-Sea project.

Sports

There are many popular professional sports teams in the Gdańsk and Tricity area. Amateur sports are played by thousands of Gdańsk citizens and also in schools of all levels (elementary, secondary, university).

The city's professional football club is Lechia Gdańsk. Founded in 1945, they play in the Ekstraklasa, Poland's top division. Their home stadium, Stadion Miejski, was one of the four Polish stadiums to host the UEFA Euro 2012 competition, as well as the host of the 2021 UEFA Europa League Final. Other notable football clubs are Gedania 1922 Gdańsk and SKS Stoczniowiec Gdańsk, which both played in the second tier in the past.

Other notable clubs include:
Speedway club Wybrzeże Gdańsk, which competes in the second tier as of 2020, but for decades competed in Poland's top division, most recently in 2014, where it finished 2nd in 1967, 1978 and 1985;
Rugby club Lechia Gdańsk, which competes in Poland's top division, 13 times Polish champions, most recently in 2014;
Handball club GKS Wybrzeże Gdańsk, which plays in the Poland's top division, 10 times Polish champions, most recently in 2001, two times European Cup runners up;
Ice Hockey club Stoczniowiec Gdańsk, which competes in Poland's top division, finishing 3rd in 2003;
Volleyball club Trefl Gdańsk, which competes in Poland's top division, and finished 2nd in 2015.

The city's Hala Olivia was a venue for the official 2009 EuroBasket, and the Ergo Arena was one of the 2013 Men's European Volleyball Championship, 2014 FIVB Volleyball Men's World Championship and 2016 European Men's Handball Championship venues.

Politics and local government

Contemporary Gdańsk is one of the major centres of economic and administrative life in Poland. It has been the seat of a Polish central institution, the Polish Space Agency, several supra-regional branches of further central institutions such as the Energy Regulatory Office, the Office of Electronic Communications, the Civil Aviation Authority, the Office of Rail Transport and the Office of Competition and Consumer Protection, as well as the supra-regional (appellate-level) institutions of justice: the Court of Appeals, the Regional Public Prosecutor's Office, and the branch of the Institute of National Remembrance. As the capital of the Pomeranian Voivodeship it has been the seat of the Pomeranian Voivodeship Office, the Sejmik, and the Marshall's Office of the Pomeranian Voivodeship and other voivodeship-level institutions.

Regional centre
Gdańsk Voivodeship was extended in 1999 to include most of former Słupsk Voivodeship, the western part of Elbląg Voivodeship and Chojnice County from Bydgoszcz Voivodeship to form the new Pomeranian Voivodeship.
By 1998, Tricity constituted an absolute majority of the population; almost half of the inhabitants of the new region live in the centre.

Municipal government
Legislative power in Gdańsk is vested in a unicameral Gdańsk City council (Rada Miasta), which comprises 34 members. Council members are elected directly every four years. Like most legislative bodies, the City Council divides itself into committees which have the oversight of various functions of the city government.

 City Council in 2002–2006
Civic Platform – 15 seats
Democratic Left Alliance – Labour Union – 6 seats
Law and Justice – 6 seats
League of Polish Families – 5 seats
Self-Defence of the Republic of Poland – 1 seat
Bogdan Borusewicz – 1 seat

 City Council in 2006–2010
Civic Platform – 21 seats
Law and Justice – 13 seats

 City Council in 2010–2014
Civic Platform – 26 seats
Law and Justice – 7 seats
Democratic Left Alliance – 1 seat

 City Council in 2014–2018
Civic Platform – 22 seats
Law and Justice – 12 seats

 City Council in 2018–2023

Civic Coalition – 15 seats
Law and Justice – 12 seats
All for Gdańsk – 7 seats

Districts
Gdańsk is divided into 34 administrative divisions: 6  and 28 . Gdańsk  include Chełm, Piecki-Migowo, Przymorze Wielkie, Śródmieście, Wrzeszcz Dolny, Wrzeszcz Górny.

 are Aniołki, Brętowo, Brzeźno, Jasień, Kokoszki, Krakowiec-Górki Zachodnie, Letnica, Matarnia, Młyniska, Nowy Port, Oliwa, Olszynka, Orunia-Św. Wojciech-Lipce, Osowa, Przeróbka, Przymorze Małe, Rudniki, Siedlce, Sobieszewo Island, Stogi, Strzyża, Suchanino, Ujeścisko-Łostowice, VII Dwór, Wzgórze Mickiewicza, Zaspa-Młyniec, Zaspa-Rozstaje, Żabianka-Wejhera-Jelitkowo-Tysiąclecia.

Education and science

There are 15 higher schools including three universities. In 2001 there were 60,436 students, including 10,439 graduates.
University of Gdańsk (Uniwersytet Gdański)
Gdańsk University of Technology (Politechnika Gdańska)
Gdańsk Medical University (Gdański Uniwersytet Medyczny)
Academy of Physical Education and Sport of Gdańsk (Akademia Wychowania Fizycznego i Sportu im. Jędrzeja Śniadeckiego)
Musical Academy (Akademia Muzyczna im. Stanisława Moniuszki)
Arts Academy (Akademia Sztuk Pięknych)
Institute of Fluid Flow Machinery of the Polish Academy of Sciences – Instytut Maszyn Przepływowych im. Roberta Szewalskiego PAN
Instytut Budownictwa Wodnego PAN
AteneumSzkoła Wyższa
Gdańska Wyższa Szkoła Humanistyczna
Gdańska Wyższa Szkoła Administracji
Wyższa Szkoła Społeczno-Ekonomiczna
Wyższa Szkoła Turystyki i Hotelarstwa w Gdańsku
Wyższa Szkoła Zarządzania
WSB Universities – WSB University in Gdańsk

Scientific and regional organizations
Gdańsk Scientific Society
Baltic Institute (Instytut Bałtycki), established 1925 in Toruń, since 1946 (?) in Gdańsk
TNOiK – Towarzystwo Naukowe Organizacji i Kierowania (Scientific Society for Organization and Management) O/Gdańsk
IBNGR – Instytut Badań nad Gospodarką Rynkową (The Gdańsk Institute for Market Economics)

International relations

Twin towns – sister cities

Gdańsk is twinned with:

 Helsingør, Denmark
 Bremen, Germany
 Cleveland, United States
 Kalmar, Sweden

 Nice, France
 Astana, Kazakhstan

 Rotterdam, Netherlands
 Sefton, United Kingdom
 Turku, Finland
 Vilnius, Lithuania
 Komádi, Hungary
 Soroksár, Hungary

Former twin towns
 Kaliningrad, Russia
 Saint Petersburg, Russia

On 3 March 2022, Gdańsk City Council passed a unanimous resolution to terminate the cooperation with the Russian cities of Kaliningrad and Saint Petersburg as a response to the Russian invasion of Ukraine.

Partnerships and cooperation
Gdańsk also cooperates with:
 Ghent, Belgium
 Le Havre, France
 Marseille, France
 Odesa, Ukraine

Population after World War II

The 1923 census conducted in the Free City of Danzig indicated that of all inhabitants, 95% were German, and 3% were Polish and Kashubian. The end of World War II is a significant break in continuity with regard to the inhabitants of Gdańsk.

German citizens began to flee en masse as the Soviet Red Army advanced, composed of both spontaneous flights driven by rumors of Soviet atrocities, and organised evacuation starting in the summer of 1944 which continued into the spring of 1945. Approximately 1% (100,000) of the German civilian population residing east of the Oder–Neisse line perished in the fighting prior to the surrender in May 1945. German civilians were also sent as "reparations labour" to the Soviet Union.

Poles from other parts of Poland replaced the former German-speaking population, with the first settlers arriving in March 1945. On 30 March 1945, the Gdańsk Voivodeship was established as the first administrative Polish unit in the Recovered Territories. As of 1 November 1945, around 93,029 Germans remained within the city limits. The locals of German descent who declared Polish nationality were permitted to remain, as of 1 January 1949 13,424 persons who had received Polish citizenship in a post-war "ethnic vetting" process lived in Gdańsk.

The settlers can be grouped according to their background:
Poles that had been freed from forced labor in Nazi Germany
Repatriates: Poles expelled from the areas east of the new Polish-Soviet border. This included assimilated minorities such as the Polish-Armenian community
Poles incl. Kashubians relocating from nearby villages and small towns
Settlers from central Poland migrating voluntarily
Non-Poles forcibly resettled during Operation Vistula in 1947. Large numbers of Ukrainians were forced to move from south-eastern Poland under a 1947 Polish government operation aimed at dispersing, and therefore assimilating, those Ukrainians who had not been expelled eastward already, throughout the newly acquired territories. Belarusians living around the area around Białystok were also pressured into relocating to the formerly German areas for the same reasons. This scattering of members of non-Polish ethnic groups throughout the country was an attempt by the Polish authorities to dissolve the unique ethnic identity of groups like the Ukrainians, Belarusians, and Lemkos, and broke the proximity and communication necessary for strong communities to form.
Jewish Holocaust survivors, most of them Polish repatriates from the Eastern Borderlands.
Greeks and Slav Macedonians, refugees of the Greek Civil War.

People

See also

Tourism in Poland
List of honorary citizens of Gdańsk
764 Gedania – a minor planet orbiting the Sun
Danzig Highflyer
Father Eugeniusz Dutkiewicz SAC Hospice
Kashubians
Kursenieki
List of neighbourhoods of Gdańsk
St. Mary's Church, Gdańsk
Laznia Centre for Contemporary Art
Ronald Reagan Park
Live in Gdańsk

Notes

References

Sources

External links

The official tourist service of the Marshal's Office of the Pomeranian Voivodeship
Virtual Gdańsk 
Danzig 
Gdańsk 
European Jamboree 2020 
The power of Gdansk article at The Globe and Mail
7 Reasons to Fall in Love with Gdańsk

 
980s establishments
Populated places established in the 10th century
Members of the Hanseatic League
City counties of Poland
Cities and towns in Pomeranian Voivodeship
Port cities and towns of the Baltic Sea
Geographical naming disputes
Holocaust locations in Poland
Nazi war crimes in Poland